Martin Paul Woods (born 1 January 1986) is a Scottish footballer who plays as a midfielder for National League North club Brackley Town.

Woods career started at Leeds United and during his time there had a spell on loan at Hartlepool United. He then moved on to Sunderland, Rotherham United and Doncaster Rovers, and also spent time on loan at Yeovil Town. Following a short spell at Barnsley, Woods signed for Ross County in October 2014. He had two spells with County, interrupted by a year at Shrewsbury Town. Woods signed for Partick Thistle in October 2017, then joined Dundee in November 2018. After a brief hiatus, Woods played with Halifax Town for two seasons.

Football career

Leeds United
Woods started his career at the Leeds United academy, where he was capped by Scotland Youth. He made just one substitute appearance for the first team. In September 2004, he went on loan to Hartlepool United, making his professional debut in a 3–2 defeat away at Oldham Athletic on 11 September 2004. In October 2004, his loan was extended for a second month.

Sunderland
At the end of his Leeds contract, Woods turned down a new deal, in favour of joining Sunderland. He made seven appearances in the Premier League, but this included only one start. In May 2006, Woods was released by Sunderland.

Rotherham United
After leaving Sunderland, Woods signed for Rotherham United in League One. He scored his first senior goal, described as "spectacular" by BBC Sport, in a 3–2 defeat against Doncaster Rovers on 27 January 2007.

Doncaster Rovers
On 5 June 2007, Woods transferred to Doncaster Rovers, agreeing a four-year contract. He signed another long-term contract extension in September 2010.

Following his release in the summer of 2013, he had a final brief spell at the club on non-contract terms, before opting to join Barnsley.

Barnsley
Woods signed for Barnsley on a short-term deal at the end of the January 2014 transfer window.

Ross County
Woods signed for Scottish Premiership club Ross County in October 2014, agreeing a contract until the end of January 2015. He made his debut on 25 October 2014, as a substitute in a 2–2 draw against St Mirren. On 7 January 2015, Woods extended his contract until the end of the season.

Shrewsbury Town
At the end of the Scottish Premiership season, Woods joined newly promoted League One side Shrewsbury Town in May 2015.

Ross County (second spell)
On 31 August 2015, having asked to be released from his contract with Shrewsbury, Woods returned to Ross County, signing a two-year contract with the option of a third. This option was not exercised, and he left Ross County in the summer of 2017.

Partick Thistle
Woods signed for Partick Thistle in October 2017, on a contract to the end of the 2017–18 season. Thistle were relegated via the playoffs at the end of the season. Following that relegation, Woods was one of many players released by Thistle.

Dundee
Woods signed a short-term contract with Dundee in November 2018. He was released by the club at the end of the season.

Halifax Town 
After a full season out, Woods signed with National League side FC Halifax Town. After two seasons with the club, Woods would leave Halifax in June 2022.

Brackley Town
On 7 October 2022, Woods signed for National League North club Brackley Town.

International career
Woods was capped by Scotland at schoolboy, under-17, under-19 and under-21 levels.

Career statistics

Honours

Ross County
Scottish League Cup: 2015–16

References

External links

1986 births
Footballers from Airdrie, North Lanarkshire
Living people
Association football midfielders
Scottish footballers
Leeds United F.C. players
Hartlepool United F.C. players
Sunderland A.F.C. players
Rotherham United F.C. players
Doncaster Rovers F.C. players
Yeovil Town F.C. players
Barnsley F.C. players
Ross County F.C. players
Shrewsbury Town F.C. players
Partick Thistle F.C. players
Dundee F.C. players
FC Halifax Town players
Brackley Town F.C. players
Premier League players
English Football League players
National League (English football) players
Scottish Professional Football League players
Scotland youth international footballers
Scotland under-21 international footballers